Anahuarque (also spelled Anahuarqui, Ana Huarqui or Anawarki) is a mountain in the Andes of Peru southeast of the city of Cusco, about  high. It is located in the Cusco Region, Cusco Province, in the districts San Sebastián and Santiago, west of the mountain Wanakawri.

See also 
 Araway Qhata
 Pachatusan
 Pikchu
 Pillku Urqu
 Sinqa

References

Mountains of Peru
Mountains of Cusco Region